The 2008 Holy Cross Crusaders football team was an American football team that represented the College of the Holy Cross during the 2008 NCAA Division I FCS football season. Holy Cross finished second in the Patriot League. 

In their fifth year under head coach Tom Gilmore, the Crusaders compiled a 7–4 record. Daryl Brown and Dominic Randolph were the team captains.

The Crusaders outscored opponents 378 to 284. Their 5–1 conference record placed just half a game behind first place in the seven-team Patriot League standings. 

Holy Cross played its home games at Fitton Field on the college campus in Worcester, Massachusetts.

Schedule

References

Holy Cross
Holy Cross Crusaders football seasons
Holy Cross Crusaders football